WASP-78, is a single F-type main-sequence star about 2500 light-years away. It is likely to be younger than the Sun at 3.4 billion years. WASP-78 is depleted in heavy elements, having a 45% concentration of iron compared to the Sun.

Planetary system
In 2012 a transiting hot Jupiter planet b was detected on a circular orbit. The planetary equilibrium temperature is 2350 K, while the nightside temperature measured in 2019 is 2200 K. The dayside planetary temperature measured in 2020 is 2560 K.

A survey in 2016 measured a Rossiter-McLaughlin effect and found the planetary orbit is well aligned with the equatorial plane of the star, misalignment equal to  −6.4° The planet cannot have formed  in its current orbit and has likely undergone in the past a migration from the initial highly eccentric orbit.

References

Eridanus (constellation)
F-type main-sequence stars
Planetary systems with one confirmed planet
Planetary transit variables
J04150149-2206591